Wichnor Viaduct (formerly known as Croxall Viaduct) is a  viaduct on the former Birmingham and Derby Junction Railway  line near Wychnor, Staffordshire, England now part of the Cross Country Route.

Construction

It was built in timber by the Birmingham and Derby Junction Railway as Croxall Viaduct to cross the River Trent and the River Tame at Wychnor, Staffordshire. There were 52 bays of  span each. The contract was let in March 1838 and it was built in just over 1 year. Passenger services began on 12 August 1839.

The wooden viaduct was rebuilt in wrought iron in 1879.

Some  of handrail tubing was installed. Work was undertaken between August 1931 and August 1932, 3 spans at a time on Sundays only to minimise disruption to rail traffic.

References

Bridges completed in 1839
Railway viaducts in Staffordshire
Midland Railway